Pseudomonas synxantha is a fluorescent rhizosphere bacterium with nematicidal properties. Based on 16S rRNA analysis, P. synxantha has been placed in the P. fluorescens group.

References

External links
Type strain of Pseudomonas synxantha at BacDive -  the Bacterial Diversity Metadatabase

Pseudomonadales
Bacteria described in 1840